The Security Forces Command  is the military and security force of the unrecognized Turkish Republic of Northern Cyprus.

It is a 15,000 strong force primarily made up of conscripted Turkish Cypriot males between the ages of 18 and 40. It is a combined arms force, with land, air and naval elements.

This force is supplemented by the 17,500–30,000 strong Turkish Military Forces in Northern Cyprus stationed on the island.

History
The Republic of Cyprus' constitution provided for a bi-communal army (i.e. Greek and Turkish Cypriot) on a 60/40 per cent basis. The Cyprus army composed by both main Cypriot ethnic groups was created in 1960 yet was dismantled in the scope of the interethnic conflict 1963-4. Since then, both communities have maintained their independent armed forces. Even before independence, the Turkish Cypriot community (and similarly the Greek Cypriot community) maintained its own paramilitary force (the Türk Mukavemet Teşkilatı or TMT), trained and equipped by the Turkish Army (ibid). In 1967 this force was renamed the Mücahit ("Mujahideen"), and in 1975 the Mücahit was renamed the Turkish Cypriot Security Force. In 1974, Turkey led an invasion of Cyprus with the aim of protecting the Turkish minority population after a Greek-inspired coup brought a threat of union of the island with Greece. Since then there have been no major fighting in Cyprus and the island continues to be divided.

Organization
The Turkish Cypriot Security Force is under the command of an officer of the Turkish Army. The officer is appointed by the Turkish Armed Forces and holds the rank of major general, whereas the head of the Turkish military forces in Northern Cyprus holds a higher rank as lieutenant general.

It includes 4 Infantry Regiments and the Coast Guard Command, two of which are expedition and the other two are (ready). In addition, the TRNC Police Organization is included in the Security Forces. The organization is as follows:

1st Infantry Regiment 
2nd Infantry Regiment 
3rd Infantry Regiment 
4th Infantry Regiment
Aviation Unit Command 
TRNC Coast Guard Command 
Directorate General for Police
Special Task Force Command  
Logistics Support Command  
UAV command in Geçitkale Air Base

According to observers a large part of its budget was covered by the Turkish army, upon which it depended for training and equipment. It is also believed that the majority of its officers came from the ranks of the Turkish Army officer corps on temporary leave from their regular duties and its operations were controlled by the Turkish army.

Strength
As of 2009, the strength of this force was believed to be about 9,000. It was organized into fifteen battalions in two brigades, infantry battalions armed with light weapons plus some artillery units equipped with mortars.
	
Turkish Cyprus's Coast Guard has 36 vessels. Coast Guard operates: KKTC SG 01 (Class: Turk type 80; construction:1997-2000; active since:2000)

In March, 2023, Turkish Cyprus's Coast Guard started to operate TRNC SG-110 (BOĞAZ), TRNC SG-111 (LEFKE) and TRNC SG-112 (SERDARLI) modern assault boats.

Military ranks of Turkish Republic of Northern Cyprus 
Due to its close ties to Turkey, Northern Cyprus shares a rank structure similar to that of Turkey.

Commissioned officer ranks
The rank insignia of commissioned officers.

Other ranks
The rank insignia of non-commissioned officers and enlisted personnel.

Compulsory military service 
According to the TRNC Constitution, every male citizen has a military service obligation. The recruitment age is 18 years.

Military service periods:

 15 months in private equilibrium
 12 months in reserve officer equivalent
 Reserve officer, sergeant equivalent 12 months
 8 months in short term equilibrium
 It is 1 month provided that it fulfills its special status (paid and / or short term service) obligation.

See also

 Cyprus Turkish Peace Force Command
 Cypriot National Guard
 Hellenic Force in Cyprus
 Directorate General for Police

References

Bibliography
 Christopher Hitchens - Cyprus, Hostage to History: From the Ottomans to Kissinger
Notes

External links
 Official website (Turkish)
 Military of Northern Cyprus on Reddet
 Library of Congress - Country Study
 Cypnet

Northern Cyprus
Northern Cyprus
Military of Northern Cyprus
Military units and formations established in 1976
1976 establishments in Cyprus
Northern Cyprus
Law enforcement in Northern Cyprus